Timothy George Haskell  is a New Zealand scientist.

Career and impact
Haskell started his career at the Physics and Engineering Laboratory of DSIR (New Zealand) and remained with them through its evolution to Industrial Research Limited (IRL). He shifted to Callaghan Innovation in 2012.

He worked with Bill Robinson on the development and installation of earthquake base isolation foundations for Te Papa. However, he is best known for his development of "Camp Haskell" - a containerised facility for working on the Sea ice of McMurdo Sound. He had equipment mounted on the Erebus Glacier Tongue when it calved in 1990. He had just finished a field trip to the glacier in 2010 when it next calved.
 
He worked with Paul Callaghan for a time, developing portable Nuclear magnetic resonance (NMR) technology. Initial application to the determination of sea ice heterogeneity evolved to become a range of bench-top NMR devices developed by the spin-off company Magritek.

In 2009 the ocean passage between Ross Island and White Island (Ross Archipelago) was named Haskell Strait, Antarctica.

Awards 
 2019 - Thomson Medal from the Royal Society Te Apārangi
 2008 – New Zealand Antarctic Medal (NZAM) in the 2008 New Year Honours
 2007 – Royal Society Te Apārangi Hector Medal
 2006 – New Zealand Association of Scientists Marsden Medal
 1996 – Royal Society Science and Technology Medal

References

New Zealand scientists
Living people
Year of birth missing (living people)
University of Canterbury alumni
People associated with Department of Scientific and Industrial Research (New Zealand)
New Zealand Antarctic scientists